John Karlsen, sometimes credited as Charles John Karlsen or John Karlson (20 October 1919 – 5 July 2017), was an actor from New Zealand who was active in cinema between 1958 and 2003. He is best known for Bill & Ted's Excellent Adventure (1989), The Black Stallion (1979) and The Sin Eater (2003).  In Europe he appeared in mostly Italian films.

Karlsen was born in Wellington, New Zealand, and launched his career in Europe in the late 1950s.

His filmography includes 80 titles, including several works for television.

Karlsen died on 5 July 2017 in Auckland, New Zealand, at the age of 97.

Selected filmography

 The Beautiful Legs of Sabrina (1958) as The Security Guard at Jeweller's Shop (uncredited)
 The Naked Maja (1958) as Inquisitor
 Francis of Assisi (1961) as Friar (uncredited)
 Battle of the Worlds (1961) as United Commission Leader (uncredited)
 Werewolf in a Girls' Dormitory (1961) as Old Man
 A Difficult Life (1961) as Smoking University Professor (uncredited)
 Pontius Pilate (1962) as Roman Senator
 The Witch's Curse (1962) as Burgomeister
 It Happened in Athens (1962) as King of Greece (uncredited)
 Toto and Peppino Divided in Berlin (1962) as Nazist (uncredited)
 The Seventh Sword (1962) as The Old Actor (uncredited)
 8½ (1963) as Un uomo in auto (uncredited)
 Cleopatra (1963) as High Priest (uncredited)
 Il Boom (1963) as Occulist
 Crypt of the Vampire (1964) as Franz Karnstein
 Un commerce tranquille (1964) as Priest
 Le bambole (1965) as Husband (segment "La minestra")
 Crack in the World (1965) as Dr. Reynolds
 Two Mafiosi Against Goldfinger (1965) as Stevenson
 Me, Me, Me... and the Others (1966) as Producer
 The She Beast (1966) as Count Von Helsing
 Modesty Blaise (1966) as Oleg
 Agent 3S3: Massacre in the Sun (1966) as Tereczkov's Boss
 Our Men in Bagdad (1966) as Botschafter
 El Greco (1966) as Prosecutor
 Requiem for a Secret Agent (1966) as Franco
 The Christmas That Almost Wasn't (1966) as Blossom
 Mission Stardust (1967) as Crest
 Face to Face (1967) as University Dean (uncredited)
 I barbieri di Sicilia (1967) as German Chemist (uncredited)
 Your Turn to Die (1967) as Photographer in Nightclub (uncredited)
 L'oro di Londra (1968) as Ed
 Fenomenal e il tesoro di Tutankamen (1968) as Prof. Micklewitz
 Spirits of the Dead (1968) as Schoolmaster in Yard (segment "William Wilson") (uncredited)
 Galileo (1968)
 I See Naked (1969) as Psychiatrist (uncredited)
 Carnal Circuit (1969) as Fletcher (uncredited)
 Fellini Satyricon (1969) as Man in Litter (uncredited)
 Juliette de Sade (1969) as The Marchese
 Tre nel mille (1971)
 Stanza 17-17 palazzo delle tasse, ufficio imposte (1971) as Strongbox Seller (uncredited)
 Slaughter Hotel (1971) as Professor Osterman
 What? (1972) as Man-Servant Edward (uncredited)
 Polvere di stelle (1973) as German Commander (uncredited)
 The Kiss (1974) as Friedrich (uncredited)
 Footprints on the Moon (1975) as Alfred Lowenthal
 Prete, fai un miracolo (1975) as vescovo Ritter
 The Messiah (1975) as Caiaphas
 Fellini's Casanova (1976) as Lord Talou
 I contrabbandieri di Santa Lucia (1979)
 The Black Stallion (1979) as Archaeologist
 The Warning (1980) as Ferdinando Violante
 Pronto... Lucia (1982)
 Good King Dagobert (1984) as Corbus
 Detective School Dropouts (1986) as Museum Guide
 I Love N.Y. (1987) as the Butler
 La monaca di Monza (1987) as Don Carlo
 Stradivari (1988) as Grand Chamberlain
 The Little Devil (1988) as Anziano monsignore
 The Gamble (1988)
 Bill & Ted's Excellent Adventure (1989) as Evil Duke
 The Church (1989) as Heinrich
 Frankenstein Unbound (1990) as Parson
 Stasera a casa di Alice (1990) as Il suocero
 Count Max (1991) as Il maggiordomo
 Killer Rules (1993, TV Movie) as Lord Elston
 E.T.A. Hoffmanns Der Sandmann (1993) as Spalanzini
 Caro dolce amore (a.k.a. Honey Sweet Love...) (1994) as Sir John Atherton
 Screw Loose (1999) as Dr. Caputo
 The Sin Eater (2003) (a.k.a. The Order) as Eden's Manservant
 Il nascondiglio (2007) (final film role)

References

External links
 

1919 births
2017 deaths
20th-century New Zealand male actors
21st-century New Zealand male actors
New Zealand male film actors
People from Wellington City